Gerald Smith (born 18 November 1939) is an English former semi-professional footballer who played as a left winger.

Career
Born in Dalton, Smith spent his early career with Lockwood Civic YC and Huddersfield Town. He was signed by Bill Shankly for Huddersfield in May 1958.

He signed for Bradford City in July 1960, on part-time terms whilst he worked as a typewriter mechanic. He made a total of 11 appearances for the club, scoring 3 goals - 7 league, 3 FA Cup (scoring 2 goals), and 1 League Cup (scoring 1 goal). His League Cup game in November 1960, in which Bradford City beat Manchester United, was also Bradford City's first ever match in the competition.

He moved to Scarborough in June 1961, and later played for Frickley Colliery and Denaby United.

As of February 2013 Smith was living in Newsome with his wife, and had three grandchildren.

Sources

References

1939 births
Living people
English footballers
Huddersfield Town A.F.C. players
Bradford City A.F.C. players
Scarborough F.C. players
Frickley Athletic F.C. players
Denaby United F.C. players
English Football League players
Association football wingers